Beechfork Presbyterian Church (also Pleasant Grove Presbyterian Church) is a historic church near Springfield, Kentucky.

The church was built in 1836 by a Presbyterian congregation that had organized three years earlier, made up of families centered along the Beech Fork north of Springfield.  It was renamed Pleasant Grove Presbyterian Church . The building is a brick nave plan church, the original facade is laid in Flemish bond.  An 1889-1900 renovation added a Gothic vestibule to the front and Gothic arched windows.

The building and the adjoining cemetery were added to the National Register of Historic Places in 1989.

References

Presbyterian churches in Kentucky
Churches on the National Register of Historic Places in Kentucky
Gothic Revival church buildings in Kentucky
Churches completed in 1836
19th-century Presbyterian church buildings in the United States
Churches in Washington County, Kentucky
National Register of Historic Places in Washington County, Kentucky
1836 establishments in Kentucky